The South Fork Crooked River is a tributary,  long, of the Crooked River in the U.S. state of Oregon. Starting southeast of Hampton in Deschutes County, the South Fork flows east from near Ram Lake (dry). It passes under U.S. Route 20 at Hampton, then continues east and north for about  before entering Crook County. Shortly thereafter, east of Hampton Buttes, it receives Buck Creek from the right and then passes through Logan Reservoir. Flowing north, it receives Sand Hollow Creek from the left, then Twelvemile Creek from the right before crossing under Oregon Route 380 (Southeast Paulina Highway). Just north of the highway, the river joins Beaver Creek to form the Crooked River  from its confluence with the Deschutes River.

About 75 percent of the basin is rangeland; the rest is a mixture of forests, pasture, and hay fields.

See also
List of rivers of Oregon
List of longest streams of Oregon

References

Rivers of Crook County, Oregon
Rivers of Deschutes County, Oregon
Rivers of Oregon